Belgium competed at the 1976 Summer Olympics in Montreal, Quebec, Canada. 101 competitors, 75 men and 26 women, took part in 80 events in 16 sports.

Medalists
Belgium finished in 28th position in the final medal rankings, with three silver medals and three bronze medals.

Archery

In Belgium's second appearance in the modern archery competition, the nation was represented by two men, including Olympic veteran Robert Cogniaux.

Men's Individual Competition:
 Pierre Blacks — 2353 points (→ 18th place)
 Robert Cogniaux — 2346 points (→ 23rd place)

Athletics

Men's 800 metres
 Ivo Van Damme
 Heat — 1:47.80
 Semi Final — 1:46.00
 Final — 1:43.86 (→  Silver Medal)

Men's 5.000 metres
 Willy Polleunis
 Heat — 13:45.24
 Final — 13:26.99 (→ 6th place)
 Marc Smet
 Heat — 13:23.76 (→ did not advance)

Men's 10.000 metres
 Marc Smet
 Heat — 28:22.07
 Final — 28:02.80 (→ 7th place)
 Karel Lismont
 Heat — 28:17.45
 Final — 28:26.48 (→ 11th place)
 Emiel Puttemans
 Heat — 28:15.52
 Final — did not finish (→ no ranking)

Men's Marathon
 Karel Lismont — 2:11:12 (→  Bronze Medal)
 Henri Schoofs — 2:15:52 (→ 10th place)
 Gaston Roelants — did not start (→ no ranking)

Men's High Jump
 Guy Moreau
 Qualification — 2.13m (→ did not advance)
 Bruno Brokken
 Qualification — DNS (→ did not advance)

Men's Long Jump
 Ronald Desruelles
 Qualification — 7.60m (→ did not advance)

Men's Discus Throw
 Georges Schroeder
 Qualification — 54.80m (→ did not advance)

Men's 20 km Race Walk
 Godfried Dejonckheere — 1:35:03 (→ 25th place)

Boxing

Canoeing

Cycling

Seven cyclists represented Belgium in 1976.

Individual road race
 Alfons De Wolf — 4:47:23 (→ 4th place) 
 Frank Hoste — 4:49:01 (→ 36th place) 
 Dirk Heirweg — 4:55:41 (→ 47th place) 
 Eddy Schepers — 4:55:41 (→ 48th place)

Team time trial
 Alfons De Wolf
 Dirk Heirweg
 Daniel Willems
 Frank Hoste

Sprint
 Michel Vaarten — 10th place

1000m time trial
 Michel Vaarten — 1:07.516 (→  Silver Medal)

Individual pursuit
 Jean-Louis Baugnies — 11th place

Equestrian (Horse sports)

Fencing

Four fencers, one man and three women, represented Belgium in 1976.

Men's foil
 Thierry Soumagne

Men's épée
 Thierry Soumagne

Women's foil
 Marie-Paule Van Eyck
 Micheline Borghs
 Claudine le Comte

Gymnastics

Hockey

Men's Team Competition
Preliminary Round (Group B)
 Lost to Pakistan (0-5)
 Lost to New Zealand (1-2)
 Defeated Spain (3-2)
 Lost to West Germany (1-6)
Classification Matches
 9th/12th place: Defeated Argentina (3-2)
 9th/10th place: Defeated Canada (3-2) → Ninth place
Team Roster
 ( 1.) Frank Smissaert
 ( 2.) Guy Miserque
 ( 3.) Francis Bouche
 ( 4.) Serge Dubois
 ( 5.) Bernard Smeekens
 ( 6.) Bernard Mauchien
 ( 7.) Paul Urbain
 ( 8.) Armand Solie
 ( 9.) Michel Vanderborght
 (10.) Carl-Eric Vanderborght
 (11.) Robert Maroye
 (12.) Bruno De Clynsen
 (13.) Jean-François Gilles
 (14.) Jean Toussaint
 (15.) Michel Van Tyckom
 (16.) Jean-Claude Moraux
Head coach: Ernst Willig

Judo

Rowing

Sailing

Shooting

Swimming

 Geert Boekhout
 Véronique Brisy
 Colette Crabbe
 François Deley
 Chantal Grimard
 Pirette Michel
 Anne Richard
 Ilse Schoors
 Johan Van Steenberge
 Carine Verbauwen

Weightlifting

Wrestling

References

External links
Official Olympic Reports
International Olympic Committee results database

Nations at the 1976 Summer Olympics
1976 Summer Olympics
Olympics